Neon & Nude: Featuring the Feminine Gazes is the debut studio album by American pop duo Neon & Nude, which consists of former Leslie and the LY's member Leslie Hall and Pennyhawk member Kate Kennedy. The album was released on May 4, 2017 via Yarn House records.

It serves as Hall's first full-length release since 2013. The record was preceded by the single, "Kiss in the Dark," which was released on January 1, 2015. Neon & Nude: Featuring the Feminine Gazes was additionally promoted by three music videos from early 2013 to late 2015, all of which were uploaded to YouTube. Demos of some of the songs were additionally uploaded to the group's website in 2012.

Composition 
Neon & Nude: Featuring the Feminine Gazes represents a sonic departure from the duo's previous dance music they performed while in Leslie and the LY's, rather opting for a softer musical composition rooted in indie pop, while still maintaining the comedy influence found in Hall's work. The record additionally takes musical influence from country, folk, and jazz music. The album consists of lesbian love songs that feature minimal, acoustic production while the duo sings softly over the instrumentation. The album was produced by Kennedy and mixed by Titus Jones, who produced Hall's fifth solo album, Songs in the Key of Gold (2013).

Promotion

Singles 
 "Kiss in the Dark," was released as the album's only single on January 1, 2015.

Music videos 
 "Look in Love" received a music video on July 27, 2013.
 "Kiss in the Dark" received a music video on September 10, 2015.
 "I'll Try To Improve" was released as the third and final music video supporting the album on January 23, 2017.

Live shows 
The duo performed at live shows in the months preceding the release of their debut studio album. They additionally made an appearance at the GDP music festival prior to the release of the album.

Track listing

Personnel 
Taken from Neon & Nude's website.
 Leslie Hall – songwriting, vocals
 Kate Kennedy – music, vocals
 Ramona Muse – backing vocals
 Titus Jones – mixing

Release history

References 

2017 debut albums
Neon & Nude albums